Hibran or Hebran may refer to the following places:

Hibran, Iran, a village in northern Iran
Hibran, Syria, a village in southern Syria